Hugo Kanabushi (born 22 May 1989) is a Brazilian professional baseball pitcher who is a free agent.

He was selected for Brazil national baseball team at the 2013 World Baseball Classic Qualification, 2013 World Baseball Classic, 2017 World Baseball Classic Qualification and 2019 Pan American Games Qualifier.

References

External links

1989 births
Living people
Brazilian expatriate baseball players in Japan
Brazilian people of Japanese descent
Nippon Professional Baseball pitchers
Tokyo Yakult Swallows players
2013 World Baseball Classic players